Tazehabad (also Romanized as Tāzehābād) is a village in Pasikhan Rural District, in the Central District of Rasht County, Gilan Province, Iran. At the 2006 census, its population was 128, in 32 families.

References 

Populated places in Rasht County